Epigenes is a lunar impact crater that is located in the north part of the Moon, and is sufficiently close to the northern limb to appear significantly foreshortened from the Earth. It lies just to the northwest of the remains of the walled plain W. Bond. Due north of Epigenes is Goldschmidt, and the ruined crater Birmingham lies just to the southwest.

This formation is a picture in contrasts. The north and northwest parts of the rim are well-formed with little appearance of wear, while the remainder of the rim is notably eroded, particularly in the east-southeastern half. The western half of the interior floor is smooth and nearly featureless, while the remainder is somewhat hummocky and appears covered in ejecta from the east. The small crater Epigenes B intrudes into the northeastern rim.

Satellite craters
By convention these features are identified on lunar maps by placing the letter on the side of the crater midpoint that is closest to Epigenes.

References

 
 
 
 
 
 
 
 
 
 
 
 

Impact craters on the Moon